Estherwood may refer to a place in the United States:

Estherwood, Louisiana, a village in Acadia Parish
Estherwood (Dobbs Ferry, New York), a historic mansion on the campus of the Masters School